Jay Gordon may refer to:

 Jay Gordon (blues musician), American blues rock guitarist
 Jay Gordon (physician) (born 1948), American pediatrician, lecturer, and author
 Jay Gordon (singer), American singer and voice actor
 Jay H. Gordon, (1930–2007), American politician
 Jay Gordon, a character from Ninjago (TV series)

See also 
 James Gordon (disambiguation)